Appalachian Pride is the first solo album by June Carter Cash. It was released in 1975.

The entirety of the album's original sequence is included on the retrospective Keep on the Sunny Side: June Carter Cash - Her Life in Music. Her second solo album would not be released until 1999.

Track listing 
"Losin' You"
"The Shadow of a Lady"
"Gatsby's Restaurant"
"Once Before I Die"
"The L&N Don't Stop Here Anymore"
"East Virginia Blues"
"Gone"
"Appalachian Pride"
"I Love You Sweetheart"
"Another Broken Hearted Girl"
"Big Ball's in Nashville"  (not released on original album)

Personnel 
June Carter Cash - vocals
Jerry Hensley - additional vocals on "Once Before I Die"
Helen Carter - vocals, accordion

References

1975 debut albums
June Carter Cash albums
Columbia Records albums